Michael Anthony Hall (born April 14, 1968), known professionally as Anthony Michael Hall, is an American actor. He is best known for starring in films with John Hughes, which include the teen classics Sixteen Candles, The Breakfast Club, and Weird Science.

Hall diversified his roles to avoid becoming typecast as his geek persona, joining the cast of Saturday Night Live (1985–1986) and starring in films such as Out of Bounds (1986), Johnny Be Good (1988), Edward Scissorhands (1990) and Six Degrees of Separation (1993). After a series of minor roles in the 1990s, he starred as Microsoft's Bill Gates in the 1999 television film Pirates of Silicon Valley and starred in the 2001 comedy film Freddy Got Fingered. He had the leading role in the USA Network series The Dead Zone from 2002 to 2007. In 2008, he appeared in a minor role in The Dark Knight. Since 2019, Hall has appeared in ABC's The Goldbergs. He starred in the slasher film Halloween Kills (2021).

Early life
Hall was born on April 14, 1968 in the West Roxbury neighborhood of Boston. He is the only child of blues-jazz singer Mercedes Hall's first marriage. She divorced Hall's father, Larry, an auto-body-shop owner, when their son was six months old. When Hall was three, he and his mother relocated to the West Coast, where she found work as a featured singer. After a year and a half, they returned to the East, eventually moving to New York City, where Hall grew up. Hall's ancestry is English, Irish and Italian. He has one half-sister, Mary Chestaro, from his mother's second marriage to Thomas Chestaro, a show business manager. His half-sister is pursuing a career as a singer under the name of Mary C. Hall uses the name Anthony, rather than Michael. He transposed his first and middle names when he entered show business because there was another actor named Michael Hall who was already a member of the Screen Actors Guild. Hall attended St. Hilda's & St. Hugh's School of New York before moving on to Manhattan's Professional Children's School. Hall began his acting career at age eight and continued throughout high school. "I did not go to college," he has said, "but I'm an avid reader in the ongoing process of educating myself." Through the 1980s, Hall's mother managed his career, eventually relinquishing that role to her second husband.

Career

1970s–1980s 
At the age of seven, Hall started his career in commercials. He was the Honeycomb cereal kid and appeared in several commercials for toys and Bounty. His stage debut was in 1977, when he was cast as the young Steve Allen in Allen's semi-autobiographical play The Wake. He went on to appear in the Lincoln Center Festival's production of St. Joan of the Microphone, and in a play with Woody Allen. In 1980, he made his screen debut in the Emmy-winning TV movie The Gold Bug, in which he played the young Edgar Allan Poe. In 1981 he started as Huck Finn in Rascals and Robbers: The Secret Adventures of Tom Sawyer and Huckleberry Finn but it was not until the release of the 1982 Kenny Rogers film Six Pack that he gained real notice.

The following year, Hall landed the role of Rusty Griswold, Chevy Chase and Beverly D'Angelo's son, in National Lampoon's Vacation, catching the attention of the film's screenwriter John Hughes, who was about to make the jump to directing. "For [Hall] to upstage Chevy, I thought, was a remarkable accomplishment for a 13-year-old kid," said Hughes. The film was a significant box office hit in 1983, grossing over $61 million in the United States. After Vacation, Hall moved on to other projects and declined to reprise his role in the 1985 sequel.

Hall's breakout role came in 1984, when he was cast as "Geek", the scrawny, braces-wearing geek who pursued Molly Ringwald's character in John Hughes' directing debut Sixteen Candles. Hall tried to avoid the clichés of geekiness. "I didn't play him with 100 pens sticking out of his pocket," he said. "I just went in there and played it like a real kid. The geek is just a typical freshman." Hall landed a spot on the promotional materials along with co-star Ringwald. Reviews of the film were positive for Hall and his co-stars, and one for People Weekly even claimed that Hall's performance "pilfer[ed] the film" from Ringwald. Despite achieving only moderate success at the box office, the film made overnight stars of Ringwald and Hall.

In 1985, Hall starred in two additional teen-oriented films written and directed by Hughes. He was cast as Brian Johnson, "the brain," in The Breakfast Club, co-starring Emilio Estevez, Judd Nelson, Ally Sheedy, and Molly Ringwald. Film critic Janet Maslin praised Hall, stating that the 16-year-old actor and Ringwald were "the movie's standout performers." Hall and fellow co-star Molly Ringwald dated for a short period after filming The Breakfast Club. Later that year, Hall portrayed Gary Wallace, another likable misfit, in Weird Science. Critic Sheila Benson from the Los Angeles Times said Hall was "the role model supreme" for the character, but she also acknowledged that "he [was] outgrowing the role" and "[didn't] need to hold the patent on the bratty bright kid." Weird Science was a moderate success at the box office but was generally well received by critics. Those roles established him as the 80s "nerd-of-choice," as well as a member of Hollywood's Brat Pack. Hall, who portrayed Hughes' alter egos in Sixteen Candles, The Breakfast Club and Weird Science, credits the director for putting him on the map and giving him those opportunities as a child. "I had the time of my life," he said. "I'd consider [working with Hughes again] any day of the week."

Hall joined the cast of Saturday Night Live (SNL) during its 1985–86 season at the age of 17. He was, and remains, the youngest cast member in the show's history. His recurring characters on the show were Craig Sundberg, Idiot Savant, an intelligent, talented teenager with a vacant expression and stilted speech, and Fed Jones, half of the habitually high, hustling pitchmen known as The Jones Brothers. Art Garfunkel, Edd Byrnes, Robert F. Kennedy, and Daryl Hall were among Hall's celebrity impersonations. Hall had admired the show and its stars as a child, but he found the SNL environment to be far more competitive than he had imagined. "My year there, I didn't have any breakout characters and I didn't really do the things I dreamed I would do," he said, "but I still learned a lot and I value that. I'll always be proud of the fact that I was a part of its history." Hall was one of six cast members (the others being Joan Cusack, Robert Downey, Jr., Randy Quaid, and Terry Sweeney) who were dismissed at the end of that season.

To avoid being typecast, Hall turned down roles written for him by John Hughes in Ferris Bueller's Day Off (Cameron Frye) and Pretty in Pink (Phil "Duckie" Dale), both in 1986. Instead, he starred in the 1986 film Out of Bounds, Hall's first excursion into the thriller and action genre. The film grossed only $5 million domestically and was a critical and financial disappointment. Critic Roger Ebert described Out of Bounds as "an explosion at the cliché factory," and Caryn James from The New York Times claimed that not even "Hall, who made nerds seem lovable in John Hughes' Sixteen Candles and The Breakfast Club, [could] do much to reconcile" the disparate themes of the movie.

Hall was offered the starring role in the 1987 film Full Metal Jacket in a conversation with Stanley Kubrick, but after an eight-month negotiation, a financial agreement could not be reached. "It was a difficult decision, because in that eight-month period, I read everything I could about the guy, and I was really fascinated by him," Hall said when asked about the film. "I wanted to be a part of that film, but it didn't work out. But all sorts of stories circulated, like I got on set and I was fired, or I was pissed at him for shooting too long. It's all not true." He was replaced with Matthew Modine. His next film was 1988's Johnny Be Good, in which he worked with Uma Thurman and fellow Saturday Night Live cast member Robert Downey, Jr. The film was a critical failure, and some reviewers panned Hall's performance as a high school football star, stating that he, the movies' reigning geek, was miscast in the role. A review for The Washington Post claimed that the film was "crass, vulgar, and relentlessly brain-dead."

1990s 
After a two-year break due to a reported drinking problem, Hall returned to acting by starring opposite Johnny Depp and Winona Ryder in Tim Burton's 1990 hit Edward Scissorhands, this time as the film's villain. By then in his 20s, he shifted to more mature roles, trying to establish himself as an adult actor. After Scissorhands, he appeared in a series of low-budget films, including the 1992 comedy Into the Sun, where he starred as a visiting celebrity at a military air base. Film critic Janet Maslin praised his performance, writing that "Hall, whose earlier performances (in films like National Lampoon's Vacation and Sixteen Candles) have been much goofier, remains coolly funny and graduates to subtler forms of comedy with this role." The following year, he played a gay man who teaches down-and-out Will Smith to dupe rich people in the critically acclaimed film Six Degrees of Separation; Hall claimed that it was "the hardest role [he] ever had."

In 1994, Hall starred in and directed his first feature film, a low-budget Showtime comedy titled Hail Caesar about a would-be rock star who works in a pencil eraser factory. The film also co-starred Samuel L. Jackson, Robert Downey, Jr., and Judd Nelson. In addition, he produced the soundtrack for the film with composer Herbie Tribino. The film featured songs written and performed by Hall.

After a series of appearances in low-budget films and guest roles on TV series in the mid and late 1990s, he gained media attention once again in the 1999 Emmy-nominated TNT original movie Pirates of Silicon Valley, co-starring Noah Wyle as Apple Computer's Steve Jobs. Hall was widely praised for his portrayal of Microsoft billionaire Bill Gates. "I really fought for this part because I knew it would be the role of a lifetime,"  Hall said. "It was a thrill and a daunting challenge to play someone of his stature and brilliance." Hall described his physical appearance as 20-year-old Gates to the San Francisco Chronicle:

2000s 
After making a cameo appearance as himself in the 2000 comedy film Happy Accidents, Hall appeared in several made-for-TV films. He starred opposite Sheryl Lee as a cheating husband in the 2001 USA Network cable movie Hitched. In the same year, he played renowned music producer Robert "Mutt" Lange in VH1's movie Hysteria: The Def Leppard Story and starred as legendary lefty baseball pitcher Whitey Ford in Billy Crystal's highly acclaimed HBO film, 61*.

On the big screen, Hall took on supporting roles in the mystery-drama The Caveman's Valentine (2001) opposite Samuel L. Jackson, the critically panned Freddy Got Fingered (2001) opposite Tom Green, and the action-comedy All About the Benjamins (2002) opposite Ice Cube.

Hall began his first regular series role in 2002, starring as Johnny Smith in USA Network's supernatural drama The Dead Zone, a TV series adapted from Stephen King's best-selling novel. He was cast in the show after executive producer Michael Piller saw his performance in Pirates of Silicon Valley. The show debuted on June 16, 2002, and drew higher ratings for a premiere than any other cable series in television history with 6.4 million viewers. The Dead Zone quickly developed a loyal audience, with the show and Hall receiving strong reviews. The Pittsburgh Tribune-Review wrote that "Hall's Johnny flashes the qualities - comic timing, great facial expressions - that made him a star in the 1980s movies Sixteen Candles and The Breakfast Club." The Dead Zone, Hall said, "has transformed my career." The show proved to be one of USA Network's top shows and one of the highest-rated programs on basic cable.

The Dead Zone opening credits list Hall as co-producer (seasons 1–3), producer (seasons 5) and co-executive producer (season 6). Hall also directed an episode from season three, "The Cold Hard Truth," guest starring standup comic Richard Lewis. "['The Cold Hard Truth'], I feel, is my best work as a director, because I had this great crew that knows me well and has been working with me," said Hall. "I also had the best script that I've had an opportunity to direct." The show's sixth and final season premiered on June 17, 2007. USA Network officially canceled The Dead Zone in December 2007.

Hall appeared in the tenth episode of Criss Angel Mindfreaks fourth season.

Hall develops film and television projects under his production company banner AMH Entertainment. Hall starred in Aftermath, a 2010 independent crime-drama film, with Tony Danza and Frank Whaley. In 2008, Hall appeared as Gotham City television reporter/anchor Mike Engel in The Dark Knight.

2010–present 

Hall made guest appearances in two episodes of the sitcom Community.

Hall reprised his role as Rusty Griswold in 2012 in a series of Old Navy holiday commercials featuring the Griswold family. In 2011, he played the main antagonist in Season 3 of Warehouse 13. He played Walter Sykes, a man who once benefited from the use of an artifact but harboured a deep-seated anger towards the Warehouse and its agents when the artifact was taken from him (episodes 3.09, 3.11, 3.12). He also guest-starred in Z Nation in the role of Gideon, a former communications manager leading a group of zombie apocalypse survivors (only episode 2.11).

In 2016, Hall plays himself as the customer being serviced in an AT&T Mobile commercial. The same year, Hall was cast in a recurring role on the TNT drama series Murder in the First.

Following family tradition, Hall pursues his other passion, music. He is the lead singer and songwriter for his band, Hall of Mirrors, formed in 1998. The band released an album, Welcome to the Hall of Mirrors, through Hall's own RAM Records label in 1999, with collaborations from former Guns N' Roses guitarist Gilby Clarke and Prince's former keyboard player Tommy Barbarella.

On August 26, 2019, it was announced that Hall would join the cast as Tommy Doyle in the Halloween sequel, Halloween Kills.

Hall began appearing on the ABC sitcom The Goldbergs in 2019, when he played Rusty in the season 7 premiere, "Vacation", which paid homage to and poked fun at his character from his 1983 film. Since then, he has had a recurring role on the show as guidance counselor Mr. Perott.

In the media 

Hall became a regular subject of tabloid media after New York magazine named him a member of the "Brat Pack", the group of young actors who became famous in the 1980s and frequently starred together. In the late 1980s, Hall's drinking problem, which began in his early teens, made headlines. Hall eventually quit drinking and became fully sober by 1990. "The truth is, I had my partying nights, but I never really bounced at the bottom," he said. "I never went to rehab...I was able to govern myself and continue my work."

In 1990, Hall's physical appearance in Edward Scissorhands surprised audiences. His more muscular appearance and intimidating physical demeanor provoked rumors of steroid use, but Hall later said that "the weight gain was natural."

Hall's role in the 1993 film Six Degrees of Separation made news not because of what occurred onscreen, but rather what failed to occur. Hall played a gay love interest to Will Smith, who had previously agreed to a kissing scene between the two. However, on the day of the shoot, Smith backed off. Smith told the press that he called Denzel Washington for advice, who told him that an onscreen same-sex kiss was a bad career move. When asked about the incident during an interview, Hall said, "I didn't care. I wasn't that comfortable with it, either, and ultimately, we used a camera trick."

Recognition
The 2001 film Not Another Teen Movie pays tribute to Hall's numerous appearances in the teen-oriented, 1980s comedy films parodied by the movie. A brief shot of the sign over the door of a high school cafeteria reveals that the facility is named the Anthony Michael Dining Hall.  In 2006, Hall was ranked #4 in VH1's list of the "100 Greatest Teen Stars" and #41 in "100 Greatest Kid Stars."

In June 2005, The Breakfast Club was rewarded with the Silver Bucket of Excellence Award at the MTV Movie Awards, in honor of the film's twentieth anniversary. For the show, MTV attempted to reunite the original cast. Sheedy, Ringwald, and Hall appeared together on stage, and Paul Gleason gave the award to his former castmates. Estevez could not attend because of family commitments, and Nelson appeared earlier on the red carpet, but left before the on-stage reunion, for reasons unknown. Hall joked that the two were "in Africa with Dave Chappelle."

Personal life
, Hall lives in the Playa del Rey neighborhood of Los Angeles. He is godfather to Robert Downey Jr.'s son, Indio Falconer Downey.

On November 17, 2016, the Los Angeles District Attorney charged Hall with felony assault with serious bodily injury following a September 13 confrontation with a neighbor at Hall's Playa del Rey condominium complex. In September 2017, Hall pleaded no contest to a lesser charge, was found guilty, and sentenced to three years probation and 40 hours of community service. He was subsequently sued by the victim.

In 2019, Hall became engaged to Slovak-Canadian actress Lucia Oskerova.

During a 2020 interview on YouTube, Hall defended Republican President Donald Trump. While claiming to be apolitical, Hall described Trump as "Great" and further stated "I think what he's done for the country is incredible". Hall also confirmed that conservative actors get blacklisted in Hollywood and admitted to witnessing the practice in motion.

Hall assists at-risk youth through his literacy program, The Anthony Michael Hall Literacy Club, in association with Chapman University.

Filmography

Film

Television

References

Bibliography
 Holmstrom, John. The Moving Picture Boy: An International Encyclopaedia from 1895 to 1995. Norwich, Michael Russell, 1996, p. 372.

External links 

 
 

1968 births
20th-century American comedians
20th-century American male actors
21st-century American comedians
21st-century American male actors
American people of Italian descent
American male child actors
American male film actors
American male television actors
American male voice actors
American people of Irish descent
American sketch comedians
Comedians from New York City
Comedy film directors
Film directors from New York City
Living people
Male actors from Boston
Male actors from New York City
People from West Roxbury, Boston
Television producers from New York City